Henry C. Jewell (1827–1908) was an official in the United States Department of the Treasury who was Chief of the Bureau of Engraving and Printing from 1876 to 1877.

Biography

Henry C. Jewell was born in Georgetown (Washington, D.C.) in 1827 and raised in Georgetown.  He attended seminaries in Washington, D.C. and went to school in New York City.

After college, Jewell joined the United States Navy as an engineer.  After leaving the Navy, he was the chief accountant of a private banking firm.  

Jewell later joined the Bureau of Engraving and Printing.  He was Chief of the Bureau of Engraving and Printing from 1876 to 1877.

Jewell died in Georgetown in 1908 at age 80.

References

1827 births
1908 deaths
United States Department of the Treasury officials
People from Washington, D.C.
United States Navy officers
Grant administration personnel